Westwood is a town in Norfolk County, Massachusetts, United States. The population was 16,266 at the time of the 2020 United States Census.

History
Westwood was first settled in 1641 and was part of the town of Dedham, originally called 'West Dedham', until it was officially incorporated in 1897. It was the last town to split from the original town of Dedham. From early in the settlement of Dedham, the people of the Clapboard Trees Precinct were "a wealthy, sophisticated lot, familiar with the bigwigs of provincial politics and prone to the religious liberalism that was à la mode in Boston." Residents did not care for the politically more powerful Calvinist views of those who lived in the village of Dedham and asked to separate.

It was originally to have been named the "Town of Nahatan:"

In July 2005, CNN/Money and Money magazine ranked Westwood 13th on its list of the 100 Best Places to Live in the United States.

Geography

Adjacent towns
Westwood is located in eastern Massachusetts, bordered by:
 the town of Needham to the north
 the town of Dedham to the east
 the town of Canton to the southeast
 the town of Norwood to the south
 the town of Walpole to the southwest
 the town of Dover to the west

Demographics

As of the census of 2000, there were 14,117 people, 5,122 households and 3,867 families residing in the town. The racial makeup of the town was 95.98% White, 0.50% African American, 0.04% Native American, 2.48% Asian, 0.21% from other races, and 0.79% from two or more races. Hispanic or Latino of any race were 0.94% of the population.

There were 5,122 households, out of which 36.5% had children under the age of 18 living with them, 67.1% were married couples living together, 6.5% had a female householder with no husband present, and 24.5% were non-families. 22.5% of all households were made up of individuals, and 16.4% had someone living alone who was 65 years of age or older. The average household size was 2.73 and the average family size was 3.24.

In the town, the population was spread out, with 27.8% under the age of 18, 3.4% from 18 to 24, 25.4% from 25 to 44, 24.2% from 45 to 64, and 19.1% who were 65 years of age or older. The median age was 41 years. For every 100 females, there were 90.7 males. For every 100 females age 18 and over, there were 85.5 males.

The median income for a household in the town was $128,984, and the median income for a family was $157,656. Males had a median income of $71,801 versus $46,194 for females. The per capita income for the town was $71,553. About 1.3% of families and 2.5% of the population were below the poverty line, including 1.5% of those under age 18 and 5.0% of those age 65 or over.

Government
The town of Westwood operates under a home rule charter. This means that the town is given a degree of autonomy in regards to internal affairs. The charter defines the powers of elected boards, including the select board, which serves as the executive branch of government and hires a Town Administrator responsible for day-to-day operations of town departments. The legislative branch operates through open town meeting, which meets at least once and often twice a year where all residents are entitle to speak and vote on approval of warrant articles which authorize the town budget and may create or modify town bylaws. Select Board members and other town officials are elected through an annual town election at the end of April. The select board appoints residents to various volunteer boards and committees. The Town Administrator appoints town staff who manage public safety, recreation, and other services. The Select Board has three members who serve overlapping three-year terms. Michael F. Walsh, John M. Hickey, and Robert Gotti are currently Westwood's Select Board officials.  Hickey's term will be up in 2022, Walsh’s in 2023 and Gotti’s in 2024.

The town seal, designed by a descendant of Nathaniel Colburn, includes a drawing of the Town Pound. On May 14, 1700, Lt. Joseph Colburn was paid "forty shillings of the Town rate" for constructing an animal pound measuring 33' square on his land. The pound was originally made out of wood and later reconstructed with stone. By including the tree, the new town was paying homage to Dedham, which includes the Avery Oak on its seal. The tree was toppled in the 1938 New England hurricane, but a new oak was planted in its place.

Education

Public schools
Westwood has five public elementary schools:
 Deerfield
 Downey
 Paul R. Hanlon (originally Pine Hill)
 Martha Jones
 William E. Sheehan (originally Pond Plain)

Westwood has one public middle school, Thurston Middle School, named after Edmund W. Thurston. Westwood High School, the only high school in Westwood, serves the Westwood area.

Westwood High School was rebuilt over 15 years ago, and the old school, built in 1957, was demolished. The gymnasium and swimming facility from the old school were refurbished and are part of the new high school campus. The school facilities also include a multi-use artificial turf field (named after former Westwood High School principal and teacher Charles Flahive) with a synthetic track, both of which are open to the public.

Private schools
Westwood is home to Xaverian Brothers High School, an all-boys Catholic prep school and the Westwood Montessori School, preschool.

Points of interest
 Hale (formerly called Hale Reservation) – a private non-profit educational organization with 1,137 acres of land, including beaches and walking trails.
 Westwood Library – On April 7, 2010, Library Trustees hosted a groundbreaking ceremony for the town's new library. The new building was opened in Summer 2013.
 Colburn School – A school built in 1877 that is listed in the National Register of Historic Places.
 University Station – A recently built outdoor mall with restaurants, shops, and condos. University Station abuts Route 128 station, a rail station serving Amtrak and the MBTA commuter rail.
 The rock that King Philip's men hid inside during King Philip's War.
Buckmaster Pond

Houses of worship
 First Baptist Church of Westwood, 808 High Street (Association: American Baptist)
 First Parish of Westwood United Church, 252 Nahatan Street (Association:  United Church of Christ, Unitarian Universalist Association).
 Temple Beth David, 7 Clapboardtree Street (Association: Union for Reform Judaism)
 St. Denis Parish, 157 Washington Street (Association: Catholic Archdiocese of Boston)
 St. John's Episcopal Church, 95 Deerfield Avenue (Association: Episcopal Diocese of Eastern Massachusetts) stjohnswestwood.org
 St. Margaret Mary Parish, 845 High Street (Association: Catholic Archdiocese of Boston)

Westwood has an active Interfaith Council.

Transportation
 Commuter rail service from Boston's South Station is provided by the MBTA with the Route 128 station on its Providence/Stoughton Line, and the Islington station on its Franklin Line
 Amtrak trains to Providence, New Haven, New York City and Washington, D.C. also stop at the Route 128 station.

Trivia
 The remains of a cave sit along Route 109, that King Philip and his men hid inside during King Philip's War. The massive rock that once contained the cave was known as the "Oven's Mouth." It was blown up along with most of the cave in the 1950s to straighten out Route 109.
 Maj. Robert Steele, the Continental Army drummer boy during the Battle of Bunker Hill, is buried in the old Westwood Cemetery off Route 109.
 Westwood is home of the oldest animal pound in the United States.
 Westwood was a dry town until 2005. Restaurants can now apply for liquor licenses.

Notable people

 Leo Beranek, American acoustic engineer and co-founder of Internet pioneer, Bolt Beranek and Newman
 Mike Cafarella, Computer scientist and co-founder of the Apache Hadoop big data project
 Bishop Christopher Coyne, Served as parish priest of St. Margaret Mary Church
 Jon Finn, guitarist, rock musician
 Fern Flaman, former Boston Bruin and Toronto Maple Leaf. Stanley Cup winner and Hockey Hall of Famer
 Kenny Florian, Mixed Martial Arts (MMA) fighter, FOX/UFC analyst
 John Harrington, former CEO of the Boston Red Sox
 Matt Hasselbeck, NFL quarterback
 Mike Hazen, Executive vice president and general manager of the Arizona Diamondbacks
 Paul LaCamera, United States Army four-star general and infantry officer
 Jackie MacMullan, Newspaper sportswriter and NBA columnist for ESPN.com
 Josh McDaniels, American Football coach
 Peter S. Pezzati, portrait painter
 Barry Reed, American trial lawyer and bestselling author
 Robert B. Rheault, American military officer and commander of all US Army Special Forces in Vietnam in 1969
 Milt Schmidt, former Boston Bruin and Hockey Hall of Famer
 Robert Steele (drum major), drummer boy for the Continental Army during the Battle of Bunker Hill of the Revolutionary War; buried in the Old Westwood Cemetery
 Mike Woicik, Strength and conditioning coach for the Dallas Cowboys. Tied for second most superbowl rings with Bill Bellichik. (Only behind Tom Brady)

Notes

References

External links

 Town of Westwood
 Westwood Press
 Westwood Public Schools
 The Daily News Transcript A newspaper that covers Westwood.

 
Towns in Norfolk County, Massachusetts
Towns in Massachusetts